The Women's Super League (WSL), known as the Barclays Women's Super League (BWSL) for sponsorship reasons, is the highest league of women's football in England. Established in 2010, it is run by the Football Association and features twelve fully professional teams.

The league replaced the FA Women's Premier League National Division as the highest level of women's football in England, with eight teams competing in the inaugural 2011 season. In the WSL's first two seasons, there was no relegation from the division.

The WSL discarded the winter football season for six years, between 2011 and 2016, playing through the summer instead (from March until October). Since 2017–18, the WSL has operated as a winter league running from September to May, as was traditional before 2011.

From season 2014 to 2017–18, the Women's Super League consisted of two divisions – FA WSL 1 and FA WSL 2 – and brought a promotion and relegation system to the WSL. From 2018–19, the second division was renamed the FA Women's Championship.

The WSL champions, runners-up and third-placed team qualify for the UEFA Women's Champions League the following season. The current Women's Super League champions are Chelsea, who won their fifth title in the 2021–22 season.

History

The FA WSL was due to start in 2010 to replace the FA Women's Premier League National Division as the top level of women's football in England but was deferred for a year due to the global economic downturn. Sixteen clubs applied for 8 places in the inaugural season of the league: Arsenal, Barnet, Birmingham City, Bristol Academy, Chelsea, Colchester United, Doncaster Rovers Belles, Everton, Leeds Carnegie, Leicester City, Lincoln Ladies, Liverpool, Millwall Lionesses, Newcastle United, Nottingham Forest, and Sunderland. Leeds Carnegie later withdrew their application. Women's Premier League clubs Blackburn Rovers and Watford declined to apply. FA Chief Executive Ian Watmore described the creation of the league as a "top priority" in February 2010.

The inaugural WSL season kicked off on 13 April 2011 — at Imperial Fields, Chelsea's home ground — with a match between Chelsea and Arsenal, which Chelsea lost 1–0.

For the 2014 season a second division was created named FA WSL 2, with nine teams and one team being relegated from the WSL 1. WSL 1 remained as eight teams, with the WSL 2 having ten teams. The new WSL 1 licence was awarded to Manchester City. Doncaster Rovers Belles were relegated to the WSL 2. They appealed against their demotion but were unsuccessful.

In December 2014, the FA WSL announced a two-year plan to expand the WSL 1 from an eight to a ten-team league. Two teams were promoted from the WSL 2 at the end of the 2015 season, while one team was relegated to the WSL 2 with the same happening at the end of the 2016 season. Also, for the first time, a team from the FA Women's Premier League earned a promotion to WSL 2, effectively connecting the WSL to the rest of the English women's football pyramid.

The FA announced in July 2016 that the league would move from a summer league format to a winter one in line with the traditional football calendar in England, with matches played from September to May the following year. A shortened bridging season took place, branded as the FA WSL Spring Series, with teams playing each other once from February to May 2017.

Following the 2017–18 FA WSL season, WSL 1 was renamed back to the FA Women's Super League, becoming a fully professional league for the first time, with eleven teams for the 2018–19 season. Teams had to re-apply for their licence to earn their place in the league, requiring clubs to offer their players a minimum 16-hour a week contract and to form a youth academy as compulsory for the new licence criteria. Sunderland was moved down to tier 3 in the women's football pyramid after not receiving a licence whilst Brighton & Hove Albion and West Ham United were added to the league.

The league was extended to twelve teams for the 2019–20 season, with Yeovil Town relegated after going into administration and being replaced by Manchester United and Tottenham Hotspur, who gained promotion from the Championship.

In May 2020 the league was curtailed by the covid-19 pandemic. Chelsea were declared champions of the season based on a points-per-game average.

At the conclusion of the 2020–21 campaign, four first-team managers resigned from their positions at WSL clubs Birmingham, Manchester United, Arsenal, and Aston Villa. Birmingham's outgoing manager Carla Ward questioned the commitment of some of the clubs involved in WSL, whilst Manchester United's outgoing manager Casey Stoney allegedly quit because of unresolved issues surrounding lack of training facilities and other infrastructure.

Competition structure

The FA Women's Super League currently consists of twelve clubs. Initially the league was described as professional, with the top four players on each team being paid an annual salary in excess of £20,000. However, in November 2010 it was confirmed that the WSL would be semi-professional, with only a "handful" of top players full-time. Clubs' annual wage bills were expected to be approximately one-tenth of those in the now-defunct American Women's Professional Soccer.

The 2011 season included a mid-season break from 12 May 2011, to allow for the 2011 FIFA Women's World Cup. The season then resumed in early July, finishing in August 2011.

After the league fixtures, the teams compete for a knock-out cup competition, the FA WSL Continental Cup. For the 2014 season, the teams were placed into three regional groups of six. The group winners and best-performing runners-up all advanced to a knockout semi-final. Since the 2015 season, the WSL Continental Cup have been played simultaneously with the league season.

Following a review, the FA announced in September 2017 that a restructuring of the league and its licensing criteria would follow from the 2017–18 season with a goal of a fully professional top division of between 8 and 14 teams and a second division of up to 12 semi-professional teams. For the 2018–19 season, the league became fully professional.

Clubs
The following twelve clubs compete in the 2022–23 season, with foundation clubs displayed in bold text.

Players

In the first season of the WSL clubs were subject to a squad cap of 20 players. This proved unpopular with both managers and players. Ahead of the 2012 season, the rule was reviewed and the cap increased to 23 players. Players from outside the European Union, like their male counterparts, are subject to Home Office work permit regulations.

The FA said in April 2012 that the salary rule of allowing only four players per team to earn over £20,000 and that all clubs are paid £70,000 per season from a Club Development Fund should limit any financial "imbalance" between clubs. However, the introduction of a genuine salary cap remained under consideration for 2013 and beyond. Doncaster manager John Buckley revealed that his club lost Rachel Williams and other players to Birmingham City because he was working to a budget eight times smaller than that enjoyed by Birmingham.

When the 2012 WPS season was cancelled in the United States, Lincoln Ladies manager Glen Harris said that the next destination of that league's British players would be decided by "pounds, shillings and pence." Ultimately Kelly Smith, Alex Scott and Gemma Davison all joined Arsenal, while Ifeoma Dieke and Anita Asante joined the Swedish Damallsvenskan in preference to the WSL.

Champions

By season 
Teams in just bold indicate doubles with the Women's FA Cup. Teams in bold and in italics indicate trebles with the Women's FA Cup and FA Women's League Cup.

By team

Records 

. All current WSL players are in bold.

Most appearances

Top scorers

Most clean sheets

Hall of Fame 

In September 2021, the Women's Super League announced the first inductees into the Barclays FA WSL Hall of Fame, recognising significant individuals who have contributed to the growth of the women's game in England and the WSL.

Sponsorship 
In March 2019, the Women's Super League agreed a multi-million sponsorship deal with British bank Barclays from the start of the 2019–20 season. The three-year sponsorship deal is reported to be in excess of £10 million with a prize money pot of £500,000 for the league champions for the first time. The FA described the deal as "the biggest ever investment in UK women's sport by a brand".

The league's lead sponsor from 2012 to 2019 was Continental Tyres. Continental sponsored the FA's new commercial programme from 2014 to 2018 including the England women's national football team, FA Women's Cup and the FA WSL Continental Cup in addition to the WSL. During the 2011 season, Yorkshire Building Society was also a sponsorship partner along with Continental.

Broadcasting
, matches are broadcast and streamed in the United Kingdom and Ireland via the FA Player, Sky Sports, and the BBC (UK only). Internationally, select matches are broadcast in at least 12 countries, including Australia, Canada, Denmark, Dominican Republic, Finland, Germany, Italy, Mexico, New Zealand, Norway, and Sweden, and the United States.

In the United Kingdom and Ireland
Since 2017–18, many FA WSL games have been broadcast on television by BT Sport, online and red-button by the BBC (UK only), and via the league's Facebook page. BBC Sport has continued to air one game a weekend digitally via their iPlayer service and website, while subscription channel Sky Sports also holds the rights to televise a selection of matches.

Since the 2019–20 season, league matches have been streamed via the FA Player, as well as some FA Women's Championship games, highlights from the Women's FA Cup, FA Women's League Cup and international England games. Some games in the FA Player are excluded, such as those broadcast on BT Sport in the UK and Ireland due to licensing rights.

In March 2021, the FA WSL announced a new record-breaking three-year domestic television rights deal with Sky Sports and BBC, beginning with the 2021–22 season. Sky would broadcast 44 matches per season with a further 22 matches shown on BBC platforms including a minimum of 18 on BBC One or Two. All other fixtures would remain available to stream for free on the FA Player, the governing body's own over OTT service. Believed to be worth around £8 million a season, it is the biggest broadcast deal of any professional women's football league in the world and marked the first time that the WSL's rights had been sold separately from the men's game.

Previously, FA women's competitions were broadcast on ESPN from 2009 to 2013 as part of a four-year broadcast rights deal. Six live matches were broadcast in 2011 in addition to weekly highlights, with ten games expected to be shown in 2012. ESPN broadcast the opening game of the WSL between Chelsea and Arsenal at Imperial Fields, Morden on 13 April 2011, a game Arsenal won 1–0 with a first half goal by Gilly Flaherty. The second televised game took place on 12 May 2011 as Doncaster Belles lost 1–0 to Everton Ladies at the Keepmoat Stadium, Doncaster.

In 2013, BBC Two broadcast four WSL programmes during the 2013–14 season. Each programme featured goal round-ups, highlights, features and previews of England's World Cup qualifiers.

International

See also 
 FA WSL Spring Series
 List of FA WSL clubs
 FA WSL records and statistics
 List of professional sports teams in the United Kingdom
 List of association football competitions
 Women's sports

References

External links

WSL at WomensSoccerUnited.com

 
1
England
Sports leagues established in 2011
2011 establishments in England